PCCL may refer to:

 Philippine Collegiate Champions League
 Prime Capital & Credit Limited (PCCL), Nairobi, owned 100% by Prime Bank (Kenya)
 Pakistan Champions cricket league